Martin Richard Flor (15 June 1772 – 24 February 1820) was a Norwegian botanist, economist, author and teacher at Christiania Cathedral School and the Royal Frederick University.

References

1772 births
1820 deaths
19th-century Norwegian botanists
Norwegian schoolteachers
Academic staff of the University of Oslo
18th-century Norwegian botanists